Wootten is a surname. Notable people with the surname include:

Ben Wootten (born 1969), New Zealand graphic designer, worked on the Lord of the Rings films
George Wootten (1893–1970), Australian soldier
Morgan Wootten (1931–2020), American basketball coach
Hal Wootten (1922–2021), Australian lawyer and judge of the Supreme Court of New South Wales
Bayard Wootten (1875–1959), American photographer

See also
Wootton (disambiguation)
Wooten
Wootten firebox 
Woottens Luxury Travel, a coach operator in Buckinghamshire, England